The men's 110 metres hurdles event at the 2013 Summer Universiade was held on 11 July.

Medalists

Results

Heats
Qualification: First 2 in each heat (Q) and the next 2 best performers (q) qualified for the final.

Wind:Heat 1: +2.2 m/s, Heat 2: +1.4 m/s, Heat 3: +0.7 m/s

Final
Wind: +1.7 m/s

References 

Hurdles
2013